Play in the Group stage of the 2014 ICC World Twenty20 took place from 16 March to 21 March 2014.

Group A

Matches

Group B

Matches

See also
 2014 ICC World Twenty20 Super 10s

References

External links
 Official 2014 ICC World Twenty20 site

Group Stage